The men's snooker singles tournament at the 2010 Asian Games in Guangzhou took place from 18 November to 20 November at Asian Games Town Gymnasium.

Schedule
All times are China Standard Time (UTC+08:00)

Results
Legend
WO — Won by walkover

Finals

Top half

Section 1

Section 2

Bottom half

Section 3

Section 4

References 
Results
Draw

External links 
 Cue Sports results at the official site of 2010 Asian Games 

Cue sports at the 2010 Asian Games